Back Brook is a tributary of Pike Run in Somerset County, New Jersey in the United States. It is located on the east side of Sourland Mountain.

Course
It flows eastward, crossing Blawenburg-Belle Mead Road and Sunset Road before running through Schuss Woods and the McAlpin Farm Easement.

Tributaries
Branch Back Brook

Sister tributaries
Cruser Brook
Pine Tree Run

See also
List of rivers of New Jersey

References

External links
USGS Coordinates in Google Maps

Tributaries of the Raritan River
Rivers of New Jersey
Rivers of Somerset County, New Jersey